Jean-François Collange  (born Le Puy-en-Velay, 1944) is a French Lutheran pastor and professor of theology.
 
He served as Lutheran pastor in Alsace and New Caledonia, before turning to exegetical studies, taking up a post of practical theology at the Faculty of Protestant Theology of the University of Strasbourg in 1981. He continued teaching at the faculty until 2000.

In 2003 he was elected President of the Protestant Church of Augsburg Confession of Alsace and Lorraine.

In 2006 he was elected the first president of the Union of Protestant Churches of Alsace and Lorraine (UEPAL). He was re-elected in 2009
 and again in 2012, but announced that he would be standing down at the end of 2013.
In an interview in 2013, he admitted that UEPAL was his own initiative.

Bibliography
 Epitre au Corinthiens - 1972
 The Epistle of Saint Paul to the Philippians, 1979  (translation of Epitre au Philippiens - 1973)
 L'éthique du nouveau testament - 1980
 L'épître de Saint Paul à Philémon (Labor et Fides) - 1987
 Théologie des droits de l'homme Editions du Cerf, 1989
 Ethique et transplantation d'organes, 2000 
 La vie, quelle vie? [Texte imprimé] : bioéthique et protestantisme, Editions Olivétan, 2007

References 

1944 births
Living people
People from Le Puy-en-Velay
20th-century Protestant theologians
French Lutheran theologians
20th-century French theologians
French Protestant ministers and clergy
20th-century Lutheran clergy